"Another Round" is a single by American rapper Fat Joe. It features R&B singer Chris Brown. The hip hop and R&B song, which samples "I Will Always Love You" by Troop, was produced by Cool & Dre and Yung Ladd and co-written by Kenneth Joseph and Jarell Perry. On October 20, 2011, the single was released for digital download on iTunes.

Background
On September 21, 2011, Fat Joe stated in an interview that besides working on The Darkside Vol. 2 mixtape, he was also working on a new studio album with the first single titled "Another Round" featuring Chris Brown.

Music video
The music video for the song which was directed by Colin Tilley premiered on MTV Jams as the Jam of The week on December 25, 2011. The video featured a dedication to Heavy D, who had died on November 8.

Remix
On April 2, 2012, the official remix premiered on Hot 97 by Funkmaster Flex. The remix features Chris Brown, Mary J. Blige, Fabolous & Kirko Bangz. It was later released on iTunes on April 3, 2012.

Track listing
 Digital single

Charts

Weekly charts

Year-end charts

Certifications

References

Fat Joe songs
Chris Brown songs
2011 singles
Contemporary R&B ballads
Music videos directed by Colin Tilley
Songs written by Fat Joe
Songs written by Chris Brown
Songs written by Dallas Austin
Songs written by Dre (record producer)
Songs written by Cool (record producer)
2011 songs
Song recordings produced by Cool & Dre
Songs written by Joyce Irby